The 1985–86 Yorkshire Cup was the seventy-eighth occasion on which the Yorkshire Cup competition had been held. This season there were no junior/amateur clubs taking part, no "leavers", but one new entrant in the form of newcomers to the league, Sheffield Eagles and so the total of entries increases by one up to seventeen. This in turn resulted in the necessity to introduce a preliminary round to reduce the number of clubs entering the first round to sixteen.

Last year's runner-up, Hull Kingston Rovers returned to the finals stage to win the trophy this year by beating Castleford by the score of 22-18. The match was played at Headingley, Leeds, now in West Yorkshire. The attendance was 12,686 and receipts were £36,327. It was the third time in the incredible eleven-year period in which Castleford. previously only once winners in 1977, will make eight appearances in the Yorkshire Cup final, winning on four and ending as runner-up on four occasions.

Background 
The Rugby Football League's Yorkshire Cup competition was a knock-out competition between (mainly professional) rugby league clubs from the county of Yorkshire. The actual area was at times increased to encompass other teams from outside the county such as Newcastle, Mansfield, Coventry, and even London (in the form of Acton & Willesden). The Rugby League season always (until the onset of "Summer Rugby" in 1996) ran from around August-time through to around May-time and this competition always took place early in the season, in the Autumn, with the final taking place in (or just before) December (The only exception to this was when disruption of the fixture list was caused during, and immediately after, the two World Wars).

Competition and results

Preliminary round 
Involved 1 match and 2 clubs

Round 1 
Involved 8 matches (with no byes) and 16 clubs

Round 2 - Quarter-finals 
Involved 4 matches and 8 clubs

Round 3 – Semi-finals 
Involved 2 matches and 4 clubs

Final

Teams and scorers 

Scoring - Try = four points - Goal = two points - Drop goal = one point

The road to success

Notes
1 * This is the first Yorkshire Cup match played by Sheffield Eagles, newly elected to the league

2 * Headingley, Leeds, is the home ground of Leeds RLFC with a capacity of 21,000. The record attendance was 40,175 for a league match between Leeds and Bradford Northern on 21 May 1947.

See also 
1985–86 Rugby Football League season
Rugby league county cups

References

External links
Saints Heritage Society
1896–97 Northern Rugby Football Union season at wigan.rlfans.com 
Hull&Proud Fixtures & Results 1896/1897
Widnes Vikings - One team, one passion Season In Review - 1896-97
The Northern Union at warringtonwolves.org

RFL Yorkshire Cup
Yorkshire Cup